Sparken is a skate park adjacent to the Hamnmagasinet and Ume River in downtown Umeå, Sweden. The park was finished in 2009 and was then the first part of a major infrastructural project in Umeå reshaping large parts of the city center, calledthe "City between the bridges" (Staden mellan broarna). The park won the Swedish Association of Architects Upper Norrland's Architecture Prize in 2012. 
The park is around 20 meters wide and 120 meters long. The park's name, which translates to The kicker in English, came from a contest.

Images

References

External links 
 Skatepark Sparken - Umeå (Swedish)

Parks in Sweden
Parks in Umeå